Aurelio Oehlers (born 5 February 2004) is a Dutch professional footballer who plays as a forward for Jong Utrecht.

Career
Oehlers played youth football for Sporting Almere, ASC Waterwijk and Ajax. In 2017, he moved to the FC Utrecht academy, where he in 2019 signed his first professional contract as a 15-year-old, keeping him at the club until 2023. He made his debut in professional football for Jong FC Utrecht in the Eerste Divisie on 19 December 2020, in the 3–1 away loss to De Graafschap, coming on as a substitute in the 80th minute for Tim Pieters. On 30 April 2021, Oehlers scored his first goal in a 4–0 league win over TOP Oss.

Career statistics

References

2004 births
Living people
Dutch footballers
Surinamese footballers
Netherlands youth international footballers
Dutch sportspeople of Surinamese descent
Association football forwards
AFC Ajax players
FC Utrecht players
Jong FC Utrecht players
Eerste Divisie players
Footballers from Almere